Ypthima ypthimoides, the Palni fourring, is a species of Satyrinae butterfly found in south India.

References

ypthimoides
Butterflies described in 1881
Butterflies of Asia
Taxa named by Frederic Moore